13 km is a rural locality (a settlement) in Topkinskoye Rural Settlement of Topkinsky District, Russia. The population was 41 .

Geography 
13 km is located 36 km west of Topki (the district's administrative centre) by road.

References 

Rural localities in Kemerovo Oblast